Bhadrachalam Road railway station (station code:BDCR) is located in Bhadradri Kothagudem district of Telangana and serves Kothagudem

Overview
Kothagudem Railway Station is referred as Bhadrachalam Road. This is one of the oldest railway stations in the Telangana. The train route initially started here for transporting coal to different parts of Nizam state. Later they started passenger Express trains to Hyderabad, Warangal, Vijayawada, Balharshah etc.

References

External links

Railway stations in Khammam district
Secunderabad railway division